The Joseph L. Mailman School of Public Health is the public health graduate school of Columbia University. Located on the Columbia University Medical Center campus in the Washington Heights neighborhood of Manhattan, New York City, the school is recognized by the Council on Education for Public Health.

Founded in 1922 as the DeLamar Institute of Public Health, it is one of the oldest public health schools in the United States. It became an official school within Columbia University in 1945. In 1999, following a $33 million grant from the Joseph L. Mailman Foundation, the school was renamed the Joseph L. Mailman School of Public Health.

The Mailman School is considered a preeminent school of public health in the United States, and is consistently ranked among the top in the nation by the U.S. News & World Report. Admission to the school is highly selective and has traditionally drawn a very international student body. , the school enrolls over 1,600 students and is one of the largest recipients for sponsored research pertaining to public health.

The school is home to the Calderone Prize, the most prestigious award in the field of public health, as well as numerous world-renowned research centers, including the Center for Infection and Immunity, ICAP, the Robert N. Butler Columbia Aging Center, and the Center for Environmental Health Sciences in Northern Manhattan.

History

In 1918, Columbia University's College of Physicians and Surgeons received a $5 million endowment from the estate of mining magnate Joseph Raphael De Lamar to establish an educational program in public health, which led to what would become the School of Public Health.  The DeLamar Institute of Public Health opened its doors at Columbia in 1922 and the following year began offering the Master of Science in Public Health degree. In 1940, the Doctor of Science of in Public Health degree was offered for the first time.

In 1945, the designation of "Institute of Public Health" was changed to the "School of Public Health" by the Trustees of Columbia University.  In 1967, the nation's first Psychiatric Epidemiology Training Program was established with funding from the National Institute of Mental Health. In 1968, School establishes the Division of Sociomedical Sciences, the first in the country to offer graduate degrees in social science with a focus on health.

Since 1992, the school has administered the Calderone Prize, regarded as the most prestigious award in the field of public health. The award is given  to an individual who has "accomplished work of extraordinary distinction in the field of public health or made a specific discovery or contribution that has had long-term national or global implications in such areas as communicable disease, environmental health, epidemiology, social and/or behavioral medicine, health policy, or any aspect of health promotion or disease prevention."

In 1998, the Mailman Family Foundation endowed the school with $33 million, at the time the largest gift ever given to a school of public health. The school was renamed the Joseph L. Mailman School of Public Health in recognition of Joseph Mailman,
businessman and philanthropist.

In 2011, the School establishes the Climate and Health Program to foster cross-disciplinary, translational scholarship on the human health dimensions of climate change. In 2012, the school redesigned and implemented a new Master of Public Health (MPH) degree to meet global health challenges, which has since become a model at other schools worldwide.

Educational programs
The Mailman School offers MPH, MHA, MS, PhD, and DrPH (Doctor of Public Health) degrees. The school's educational offerings include 10 dual degree programs with other schools at Columbia University.

Faculty
Linda P. Fried serves as dean and DeLamar Professor of Public Health at the Mailman School.

More than 172 faculty members work in over 100 countries, as well as in the Northern Manhattan community. Their research areas include climate and health, HIV/AIDS treatment and prevention, healthy aging, maternal health, mental health, environmental toxins and children's environmental health, climate and health, epigenetics, the human microbiome, the history and ethics of public health, healthcare reform and how to strengthen healthcare systems, among many other critical issues.

Department chairs
 Biostatistics - Kiros Berhane. PhD
 Epidemiology - Charles Branas, PhD
 Environmental Health Sciences - Andrea Baccarelli, MD, PhD, MPH
 Health Policy and Management - Michael S. Sparer, PhD, JD
 Population and Family Health - Terry McGovern, JD
 Sociomedical Sciences - Kathleen J. Sikkema, PhD

Student Demographics
 1,687 students
 90% master's students
 10% doctoral students
 45 states/territories represented
 56 countries represented
 29% non-U.S. citizens
 53% ethnic/racial minorities

Employment
One year after graduation, 95% of graduates were employed or continuing their studies in graduate school (8% of respondents). The overall median salary 6 months after graduation was $70,000 annually.

Research Centers

The Center for Infection and Immunity
The Center for Infection and Immunity (CII) is one of the world's largest and most advanced academic centers focused on microbial surveillance, discovery, and diagnosis. CII is directed by W. Ian Lipkin, MD, John Snow Professor of Epidemiology and Professor of Neurology and Pathology who has been named the “World’s Most Celebrated Virus Hunter” due to his speed and innovative methods of identifying new viruses.  From the onset of the COVID-19 pandemic, 50 to 60 CII researchers began collaborating with researchers at Sun Yat-sen University in China. Dr. Lipkin had advised the Chinese government and the World Health Organization (WHO) during the 2002–2004 SARS outbreak, for which China awarded him its highest honor in January 2020.  CII researchers have discovered more than 1,800 new microbes.

ICAP
ICAP at Columbia University is a leader in global public health, internationally known for tackling the world's toughest health challenges—from HIV to tuberculosis, from malaria to maternal and child health, and the growing problem of non-communicable diseases, and most recently, the COVID-19 pandemic—in more than 30 countries. As a result of ICAP's support, 40.5 million people have been tested for HIV and 2.6 million have received HIV care in ICAP-supported health facilities. ICAP is led by Wafaa El-Sadr, MD, University Professor, Dr. Mathilde Krim-amfAR Chair of Global Health, and director of Columbia World Projects.

Robert N. Butler Columbia Aging Center 
Columbia University's Robert N. Butler Columbia Aging Center is a university-wide hub for aging science and policy. Located at the Mailman School of Public Health, the center carries out a mission is interdisciplinary research, policy and education to advance aging equity. The Columbia Aging Center houses the International Longevity Center USA (ILC-USA), and it is the current home of the International Association of Gerontology and Geriatrics (IAGG). The ILC-USA is a member of the global consortium of ILCs devoted to the development of policies, awareness campaigns and interventions at the individual and societal level to best respond to populating aging and support longevity. This consortium known as the ILC Global Alliance reaches into 17 countries around the world.

The Climate and Health Program 
The Mailman School houses the Global Consortium on Climate and Health Education, a global network of 200+ Universities committed to educate their students on health impacts of climate change. The school is the first to house a climate and health training program funded by the National Institutes of Health for doctoral students and postdoctoral trainees, and has a Master of Public Health certificate program in Climate and Health.

NIEHS Center for Environmental Health in Northern Manhattan 
The Mailman School is home to the NIH/NIEHS funded Center for Environmental Health in Northern Manhattan, which includes researchers working in environmental health sciences across Columbia University. Virginia Rauh, one of the Center members, was the lead author of a landmark paper showing that chlorpyrifos, a commonly used pesticides, caused neurodevelopmental alterations in children. Her data supported tighter regulations of the pesticides that were initially opposed and blocked by the Trump administration and eventually reinstated under the Biden administration.

Epigenetics and Precision Prevention 
Since 2017, the Mailman School offers a summer Epigenetic Boot Camp for Planning and Analyzing DNA Methylation Studies, a two-day intensive boot camp of seminars and hands-on analytical sessions that provides an overview of concepts, techniques, and data analysis methods utilized in human epigenetics studies.

The Laboratory of Precision Environmental Biosciences, regarded as one of the pioneering epigenetics labs worldwide, is the central focus of a wider Precision Medicine program at the Mailman School, focusing on public health and prevention. That includes research and education on the human microbiome, extracellular RNA communication, molecular epidemiology, genomics, viromics, mitochondriomics, statistical genetics, computational biology, and biomarker sciences. Precision Medicine offers a unique combination of cutting-edge lab technology with large scale studies and applications in population sciences and public health, including predictive analytics and analysis of return on investment.

Facilities
The Mailman School of Public Health's main facility, the Allan Rosenfield Building, was constructed in 1930 at 1050 Riverside Drive in 1930 on the Columbia University Medical Campus. It served as the original New York State Psychiatric Institute until it was moved to a nearby newly constructed facility in 1998. The building is named after Allan Rosenfield, a long-time dean of the Mailman School who was referred in The New York Times as a "giant in the world of public health." Renovation work on the building included increased sustainable features.

Notable alumni

References

External links

 

Columbia University
Universities and colleges in New York City
Schools of public health in the United States
Universities and colleges in Manhattan
Educational institutions established in 1922
Medical and health organizations based in New York City
Schools of medicine in New York City
1922 establishments in New York City